
Ełk County is a unit of territorial administration and local government (powiat) in Warmian-Masurian Voivodeship, northern Poland. It came into being on 1 January 1999 as a result of the Polish local government reforms passed in 1998.

As of 2019, Ełk County's total population was 91,446, with the town of Ełk having a population of 62,006.

Neighbouring counties
Ełk County is bordered by Olecko County to the north, Suwałki County to the north-east, Augustów County to the east, Grajewo County to the south, and Pisz County and Giżycko County to the west.

Administrative division
The county is subdivided into five gminas (one urban and four rural). These are listed in the following table, in descending order of population.

References

 
Land counties of Warmian-Masurian Voivodeship